The Assumption of St Mary Magdalene or Mystic Communion is a  oil and tempera on panel painting by Antonio del Pollaiuolo, now in the Museo della Pala del Pollaiolo at Staggia Senese, now a district in the town of Poggibonsi in the Province of Siena, Italy. It shows the saint in penitence and prayer in the desert, supported by four angels and with a fifth bringing her a host.

It was originally commissioned for the parish church of Santa Maria Assunta in Staggia by the notary Bindo Grazzini, a notary active in Florence but originally from Staggia. Grazzini was also a particular devotee of Mary Magdalene, to whom he dedicated a chapel in Staggia's parish church and a small hospital in his native area. Long lost, it was rediscovered in 1899 by Guido Carocci and six years later, published by Bernard Berenson.

References

Paintings by Antonio del Pollaiuolo
Paintings depicting Mary Magdalene
Paintings in Tuscany
1460 paintings
Angels in art